Eude Ezequiel Brito Romero (born August 19, 1978), is a Dominican former professional baseball pitcher, who played in Major League Baseball (MLB) for the Philadelphia Phillies, from  to . The left-hander posted a lifetime big league win–loss record of 2–4.

Career
Brito was signed by the Philadelphia Phillies on July 3, 1998, as a non-drafted amateur free agent. For the 2005 season, Brito posted a win–loss record of 1–2, with a 3.68 earned run average (ERA). In March 2006, he pitched for the Dominican Republic national baseball team, during the inaugural 2006 World Baseball Classic (WBC), alongside Albert Pujols, among many other elite baseball players from around the globe.

Brito had begun 2006 spring training with the Phillies, but when he returned from the WBC, the team optioned him to the Triple-A International League Scranton/Wilkes-Barre Red Barons. On June 3, 2006, he was recalled to the Phils, but was sent back to the minors on June 9, after having lost his first two decisions. Despite his having notched one last MLB victory, achieved during a late-season cup of coffee with Philadelphia, Brito was granted free agency, on October 29, 2007.

On January 11, 2008, Brito signed a minor league contract with the Washington Nationals. He began the  season with the Double-A Eastern League Harrisburg Senators and quickly earned a promotion to Triple-A, before being released, on April 16, 2008. On April 22, 2008, he signed a minor league contract with the New York Mets, subsequently playing at their Double- and Triple-A levels. Brito became a free agent, following the end of the season.

External links

1978 births
Living people
Azucareros del Este players
Batavia Muckdogs players
Binghamton Mets players
Clearwater Phillies players
Columbus Clippers players
Dominican Republic expatriate baseball players in Canada
Dominican Republic expatriate baseball players in the United States
Estrellas Orientales players
Florida Complex League Phillies players
Harrisburg Senators players
Lakewood BlueClaws players
Major League Baseball pitchers
Major League Baseball players from the Dominican Republic
New Orleans Zephyrs players
Ottawa Lynx players
Philadelphia Phillies players
Reading Phillies players
Scranton/Wilkes-Barre Red Barons players
St. George Roadrunners players
Toros del Este players
World Baseball Classic players of the Dominican Republic
2006 World Baseball Classic players